Abdul Karim Shah (known as Baul Abdul Karim Shah; c. 1927 – 10 June 2014) was a Bangladeshi baul singer. He was awarded Ekushey Padak in 2011 for his contribution to arts by the Government of Bangladesh.

Awards
Ekushey Padak (2011)

References

Year of birth unknown
2014 deaths
20th-century Bangladeshi male singers
20th-century Bangladeshi singers
People from Kushtia District
Recipients of the Ekushey Padak
1920s births